Dutch cuisine is formed from the cooking traditions and practices of the Netherlands. The country's cuisine is shaped by its location in the fertile North Sea river delta of the European Plain, giving rise to fishing, farming (for crops and domesticated animals), and trading over sea, its former colonial empire and the spice trade.

Dutch cuisine is often seen as bland, due to a culture of frugality. In the late 19th and early 20th century, Dutch food became designed to be economical and filling rather than pleasing, with many vegetables and little meat: breakfast and lunch are typically bread with toppings like cheese, while dinner is meat and potatoes, supplemented with seasonal vegetables. The diet contains many dairy products and is relatively high in carbohydrates and fat, reflecting the dietary needs of the laborers. Without many refinements, it is best described as rustic, though many holidays are celebrated with special foods.

During the 20th century, Dutch cuisine and diet changed. Influenced by the eating culture of its colonies (particularly the Dutch East Indies), it became more cosmopolitan and most international cuisines are represented in the major cities.

History

12th–13th centuries 

Little evidence is available about food and drink in the late medieval Low Countries. In the consumption of pottage, the Low Countries were not very different from other Western European countries during the Middle Ages. Half-liquid pottage consisted of milk, beer, water, root vegetable and peas or grain, sometimes enriched with a piece of meat. The content changed throughout the seasons.

Beer flavoured with gruit was produced until the 14th century at the monasteries. Gruit was replaced with hop, a tradition introduced from the German city of Bremen, and this started off a beer culture and the Low Counties as a major exporter of beer. Beer was in medieval times the common drink as water was of poor quality, and milk—coming from the low-lying grasslands of Holland and Friesland—was mainly used for the production of butter and cheese. Dutch butter and cheese became famous products at an early stage and continued to be so for centuries.

14th–15th centuries 
The sea and the rivers provided an abundance of fish. The process of gibbing was invented by Willem Beukelszoon, a 14th-century Zealand fisherman. The invention created an export industry for salt herring that was monopolized by the Dutch. They began to build ships and eventually moved from trading in herring to colonizing and the Dutch Lowlands (the Netherlands as a country did not exist until 1581), ultimately leading to the Dutch becoming a seafaring power.

Herring is still very important to the Dutch who celebrate Vlaggetjesdag (Flag Day) each spring, as a tradition that dates back to the 14th century when fishermen went out to sea in their small boats to capture the annual catch (Hollandse Nieuwe), and to preserve and export their catch abroad.

Gardening was initially practiced by monasteries, but castles and country houses began also to develop gardens with herbs and vegetables and hunting grounds. The famous tourist attraction and flower park Keukenhof (literally kitchen garden) is an example of a former 15th-century hunting ground and herbs garden for Jacqueline, Countess of Hainaut's castle kitchen. Orchards for pears and apples connected to castles were later used for export and set off a Dutch horticulture tradition that remains to this day.

During the 15th century haute cuisine began to emerge, largely limited to the aristocracy. Cookery books from this period are aimed at the upper class. The first Dutch-language cook book printed in Brussels is called Een notabel boecxken van cokeryen (A notable book of cookery) from ca. 1510. It offers medieval recipes for festivities, such as sauces, game, jellies, fish, meat, pies, eggs, dairy products, candied quinces and ginger and contains one of the oldest known recipes for appeltaerten, apple pie. The recipes come from various sources, 61 of them are translations of the French recipe book Le Viandier.

Historically, Dutch cuisine was closely related to northern French cuisine, since the two countries have nearby borders and the Low Countries and Northern France have been historically ruled by the Dukes of Burgundy. This is still visible in traditional Dutch restaurants and the Southern regional cuisine, that is still colloquially referred to as Bourgondisch.

16th–17th centuries 
As the Dutch Republic entered its Golden Age in the 17th century, dishes of this kind became available to the wealthy middle class as well, often consisting of a rich variety of fruits, cheeses, meat, wine, and nuts. The Dutch Empire enabled spices, sugar, and exotic fruits to be imported to the country.

The Dutch East India Company was the first to import coffee on a large scale to Europe. The Dutch later grew the crop in Java and Ceylon. The first exports of Indonesian coffee from Java to the Netherlands occurred in 1711. By the late 17th century, tea and coffee consumption were increasing and becoming part of everyday life. Tea was served with sweets, candy or marzipan and cookies. The availability of relatively cheaper spices resulted in a tradition of spiced cookies called speculaas, the exact recipes of which were kept secret by bakers.

Vegetables, meat, poultry and salted, smoked or fresh fish and eggs were prepared in the Dutch kitchens of the time. The meal started with green salads and cold or warm cooked vegetables with dressing, vegetable dishes with butter, herbs or edible flowers and continued with numerous fish and meat dishes.

Exotic ingredients such as dates, rice, cinnamon, ginger and saffron were used. Savoury tarts and pastries followed. The meal ended with jellies, cheese, nuts and sweet pastries, washed down with sweet spiced wine. Of course, even in the Golden Age, not everyone could afford such luxuries and the everyday meal of the ordinary Dutchman was still a humble affair of grain or legume pottage served with rye.

18th–19th centuries 

In the late 18th century the potato gained popularity, to become a staple food by 1800. In the early 19th century, while the rich could eat what they desired, the working population ate bread (rye bread in some areas) and potatoes, pancakes in some areas, occasionally fish and other seafood, fruit and vegetables, but usually little meat: "the diet of the Dutch in the nineteenth century consisted of some bread, and a great deal of potatoes". Their diet was frugal, composed of such simple dishes as bread and herring. Throughout the 19th century many people suffered from some form of malnutrition.

Potatoes, in fact, were often eaten at every meal, every day of the week. They were peeled and boiled for the main meal, lunch, and then warmed and mashed for dinner, with leftovers saved for breakfast. They were served with salt, sometimes vinegar, but without gravy or any other fat, making for a diet with "incredible monotony".

During the 19th century, the poor people drank little else but water (of poor quality), sometimes watery coffee (or chicory) or tea. In some areas hot chocolate was consumed, but the most popular drinks (beside water) were beer and jenever. For most of the century beer was drunk in the southern part, where Catholicism dominated, and in Catholic enclaves in the other areas. Jenever consumption early in the 19th century was twice that of the equivalent consumption of distilled spirits in neighbouring countries.

20th–21st centuries 
The modest and plain look of what is nowadays considered the traditional Dutch cuisine, appears to be the result of a fairly recent development. In the twentieth century, the new availability of mass education meant that a great number of girls could be sent to a new school type, the Huishoudschool (housekeeping school), where young women were trained to become housewives and where lessons in cooking cheap and simple meals were a major part of the curriculum, often based on more traditional Dutch dishes, and leading to increased uniformity in the Dutch diet. Values taught in that school system included frugality, proper table manners, and healthy eating.

Regional cuisines 

Modern culinary writers distinguish between three general regional forms of Dutch cuisine.

Northeastern cuisine 

The regions in the north and east of the Netherlands, roughly the provinces of Groningen, Friesland, Drenthe, Overijssel and Gelderland north of the great rivers make up north eastern Dutch cuisine.

The region is the least populated area of the Netherlands. The late (18th century) introduction of large scale agriculture means that the cuisine is generally known for its many kinds of meats. The relative lack of farms allowed for an abundance of game and husbandry, though dishes near the coastal regions of Friesland, Groningen and the parts of Overijssel bordering the IJsselmeer also include a large amount of fish.

The various dried sausages, belonging to the metworst-family of Dutch sausages, are found throughout the region and are highly prized for their often very strong taste. Most towns and various villages have their own variety of this sausage. The region also produces the traditional smoked sausages, of which (Gelderse) rookworst is the most renowned. These sausages traditionally have been smoked over wood chips, and are served after they have been boiled in water. The sausage contains a lot of fat and is very juicy. Larger sausages are often eaten alongside stamppot, hutspot or zuurkool (sauerkraut); whereas smaller ones are often eaten as a street food. In Gelderland and Overijssel  was a traditional food.

The provinces are also home to rye bread (a kind of Pumpernickel) and many kinds of pastries and cookies. In contrast to southern Dutch cuisine, which tends to be soft and moist, the northeastern rye bread and pastries generally are of a hard texture, and the pasties are heavily spiced with ginger or succade or contain small bits of meat.

Each of the provinces of Gelderland, Overijssel and Groningen has a long-standing rye bread tradition, but rye bread from Friesland became well known because of its taste.

In terms of alcoholic beverages, the region is renowned for its many bitters (such as Beerenburg) and other high-proof liquors rather than beer, which is, apart from Jenever, typical for the rest of the country.

As a coastal region, Friesland is home to low-lying grasslands, and thus has a cheese production in common with the Western cuisine. Friese Nagelkaas (Friesian Clove) is a notable example.

Western cuisine 

The provinces of North Holland, South Holland, Zeeland, Utrecht and the Gelderlandic region of Betuwe are the parts of the Netherlands which make up the region in which western Dutch cuisine is found.

Due to the abundance of surface water and grassland, necessary to sustain dairy cattle, the area is known for its many dairy products, which for centuries includes prominent cheeses such as Gouda, Leyden (spiced cheese with cumin) and Edam (traditionally in small spheres), as well as relatively new trademarked cheese brands such as Leerdammer, and Beemster. Zeeland and South Holland produce a lot of butter, which contains a larger amount of milkfat than most other European butter varieties. A by-product of the butter-making process, buttermilk (karnemelk), is also considered typical for this region.

Seafood such as soused herring, mussels (called Zeeuwse Mosselen, since all Dutch mussels for consumption are cleaned in Zeeland's Oosterschelde), eels, oysters and shrimps are widely available and typical for the region. Kibbeling, once a local delicacy consisting of small chunks of battered white fish, has become a national fast food, just as Lekkerbekje.

Indirectly a product of the sea is Ossenworst (''ox sausage''), a raw beef sausage originating in Amsterdam, which used to be made of ox meat. This specialty has its origins in the seventeenth century, when oxen were imported large-scale from Denmark and Germany. The spices in the sausage, such as pepper, cloves, mace and nutmeg, came from the Dutch East Indies. Traditionally, aged beef was used for this sausage, that was then smoked at a low temperature such that the meat remained raw. Present-day Amsterdam ossenworst is made with lean beef, and the sausage is now often neither smoked nor aged. It is often eaten with Amsterdamse uitjes, a kind of pickled onion.

Pastries in this area tend to be quite doughy, and often contain large amounts of sugar; either caramelized, powdered or crystallized. The oliebol (in its modern form) and Zeeuwse bolus are good examples. Cookies are also produced in great number and tend to contain a lot of butter and sugar, like stroopwafel, as well as a filling of some kind, mostly almond, like .

Zaanstreek in North Holland is known for its chocolate industry, due to the development of the Dutch process chocolate in 1828 by Coenraad van Houten, that introduced the modern era of chocolate and was instrumental in the transformation of chocolate to its solid form which was up till then drunk as a liquid. The popular chocomel, a since 1932 trademarked chocolate-flavoured milk, is often the choice of drink as Koek-en-zopie, the food and drink sold on the ice during periods of ice skating. Zaanstreek is since the 16th century also known for its mayonnaise (for the Dutch a popular condiment to eat with French fries), and typical whole-grain mustards (popular to eat with bitterballen).

The traditional alcoholic beverages of this region are beer (strong pale lager) and Jenever, a high proof juniper-flavored spirit, that came to be known in England as gin. A noted exception within the traditional Dutch alcoholic landscape, Advocaat, a rich and creamy liqueur made from eggs, sugar and brandy, is also native to this region.

Southern cuisine 

Southern Dutch cuisine constitutes the cuisine of the Dutch provinces of North Brabant and Limburg and the Flemish Region in Belgium. It is renowned for its many rich pastries, soups, stews and vegetable dishes and is often called Burgundian which is a Dutch idiom invoking the rich Burgundian court which ruled the Low Countries in the Middle Ages renowned for its splendor and great feasts.

It is the only Dutch culinary region which developed an haute cuisine and it forms the base of most traditional Dutch restaurants including typical main courses served such as Biefstuk, Varkenshaas, Ossenhaas, these are premium cuts of meat, generally pork or beef, accompanied by a wide variety of sauces and potatoes which have been double fried in the traditional Dutch (or Belgian) manner.

Stews, such as hachee, a stew of onions, beef and a thick gravy, contain a lot of flavour and require hours to prepare. Vegetable soups are made from richly flavored stock or bouillon and typically contain small meatballs alongside a wide variety of different vegetables. Asparagus and witloof are highly prized and traditionally eaten with cheese or ham.

Pastries are abundant, often with rich fillings of cream, custard or fruits. Cakes, such as the Vlaai from Limburg and the Moorkop and Bossche Bol from Brabant, are typical pastries. Savoury pastries also occur, with the Brabantian worstenbroodje (a roll with a sausage of ground beef, literally translates into sausage bread) being the most popular.

The traditional alcoholic beverage of the region is beer. There are many local brands, ranging from Trappist beer to Kriek lambic. 5 of the 11 International Trappist Association-recognised breweries in the world, are located in the Southern Dutch cultural area. Beer, like wine in French cuisine, is also used in cooking; often in stews.

Foods origin

Native 
Dutch agriculture roughly consists of five sectors: tillage-based, greenhouse-based, fruit agriculture, animal husbandry and fishery.

 Tillage-based crops include potatoes, kale, beetroot, green beans, carrots, celeriac, onions, all the common kinds of cabbages, Brussels sprouts, cauliflower, endive, spinach, Belgian endive, asparagus and lettuce. Recently some initiatives have been started to encourage interest in such "forgotten" vegetables as common purslane, medlars, parsnips, and black salsify.
 Greenhouses are used to produce tomatoes, lettuce, cucumbers, and sweet peppers.
 Fruits include apples, pears, cherries, berries, and plums.
 The Dutch keep cattle for milk, butter, cheese, and for their meat, chickens for their eggs and for meat, pigs for their meat and a variety of non-edible products, and sheep for their wool and meat. Goats are increasingly kept for a cheese production. Traditionally horse meat was a common dish (steak, sausage, and thinly-sliced smoked meat), but it is less popular today.
 The fishery sector lands cod, herring, European plaice, sole, mackerel, eels, tuna, salmon, trout, oysters, mussels, shrimp, and sardines. The Dutch are famous for their smoked eel and soused herring, which is eaten raw.

Colonial influences 

Indonesian and Indo dishes became popular due to the arrival of former Dutch colonials and people of Eurasian descent into the Netherlands, especially after the independence of Indonesia from Dutch colonial rule in 1945. C. Countess van Limburg Stirum writes in her book The Art of Dutch Cooking (1962): "There exist countless Indonesian dishes, some of which take hours to prepare; but a few easy ones have become so popular that they can be regarded as 'national dishes'". She then provides recipes for nasi goreng (fried rice), pisang goreng (fried bananas), lumpia goreng (fried spring rolls), bami (fried noodles), satay (grilled skewered meat), satay sauce (peanut sauce), and sambal oelek (chilli paste). Of the Dutch-Indonesian fusion dishes the best known is the rijsttafel ("rice table"), which is an elaborate meal consisting of many (up to several dozen) small dishes (hence filling "an entire table"). While popular in the Netherlands, rijsttafel is now rare in Indonesia itself, while almost every town in the Netherlands has an Indonesian-Chinese restaurant.

Surinamese cuisine is also popular in the Netherlands, especially in the bigger cities. Surinamese establishments commonly offer roti, a staple of the Hindustani community in Suriname, various Surinamese interpretations of Chinese Indonesian cuisine, as well as Surinamese sandwiches (Surinaamse broodjes).

International influences 
Italian and American style pizzerias have become widespread. In recent decades, Arab and Turkish dishes have become increasingly popular as well, especially as a snack food. In larger towns and cities, small restaurants selling kebabs, shawarma, and falafel can be found on virtually any street corner. Nowadays, food from every nook or corner of the world can be found throughout the country, especially in bigger towns and cities, including Greek, Thai, Japanese, and African cuisines.

Structure of meals

Breakfast and lunch 

Breakfast and lunch are similar in Dutch cuisine and both consist of bread with a wide variety of cold cuts, cheeses and sweet toppings, such as hagelslag, vlokken, muisjes, treacle (a thick, dark brown sugar syrup called stroop) and apple butter. Traditionally, lunch is not to be a warm meal, and eating leftovers for lunch is not common.

The Dutch are famous for their dairy products and especially for their cheeses. The vast majority of Dutch cheeses are semi-hard or hard cheeses. Famous Dutch cheeses include Gouda, Edam, and Leyden. A typically Dutch way of making cheese is to blend in herbs or spices during the first stages of the production process. Famous examples of this are cheeses with cloves (usually the Friesian clove), cumin (most famously Leyden cheese), or nettles.

Dutch bread tends to be very airy, as it is made from yeast dough. From the 1970s onward Dutch bread became predominantly whole-grain, with additional seeds such as sunflower or pumpkin seeds often mixed with the dough for taste. Rye bread is one of the few dense breads of the Netherlands. White bread used to be the luxury bread, often made with milk as well as water. A Frisian luxury version of white bread is suikerbrood, white bread with large lumps of sugar mixed with the dough. Kerststol is a traditional Dutch Christmas bread made of bread dough with sugar, dried fruits, raisins, almond paste; and currants, and lemon and orange zest, eaten sliced, spread with butter.

Ontbijtkoek may be eaten as a substitute for a full breakfast, or simply as a snack. It is served as a small slice, usually with butter.

Tea time 

Dutch people invite friends over for koffietijd (coffee time), which consists of coffee and cake or a biscuit, served between 10:00 and 11:00 am (before lunch), 4:00 pm (between lunch and dinner) or between 7:00 pm and 8:00 pm (after dinner).
The Dutch drink coffee and tea throughout the day, often served with a single or double biscuit.

Dutch thrift led to the famous standard rule of only one cookie with each cup of coffee. It has been suggested that the reasons for this can be found in the Protestant mentality and upbringing in the northern Netherlands.
The traditionally Roman Catholic south does not share this tradition as for instance in Limburg, where serving a large vlaai (sweet pie or pastry with filling), cut into eight pieces, is tradition when visitors are expected.

A popular Dutch story (never confirmed) says that in the late 1940s the wife of the then Prime Minister, Willem Drees, served coffee and one biscuit to a visiting American diplomat, who then became convinced that the money from the Marshall Plan was being well spent.

Café au lait is also very common. It is called koffie verkeerd (literally "wrong coffee") and consists of equal parts black coffee and hot milk. The Dutch drink tea without milk and the tea is quite a lot weaker than typical English or Irish types of tea which are stronger and are usually taken with milk. Other hot drinks used to include warm lemonade, called kwast (hot water with lemon juice), and anijsmelk (hot milk with aniseed). In the autumn and winter the very popular hot chocolate or chocolate milk is drunk. Both anijsmelk and kwast are hardly drunk any more, having lost popularity.

Borreltijd 

Between 5:00 pm and 9:00 pm it is time for an alcoholic beverage (borrel), beer or wine, and a savory snack. This is when the famous bitterballen are served, a miniature variant of the kroket (croquette), deep-fried ragout-filled balls with a crunchy layer of very fine bread crumbs. Bitterballen are served with mustard.

Borreltijd mostly occurs on the weekends. Borrelnootje (peanuts in a spiced crusty coating) and kaasstengels (crusty cheese sticks) are other typical borrel snacks.

Dinner 

Dinner, traditionally served early by international standards, starts around or even before 6 p.m. It is not uncommon for restaurants outside of major cities to be closed by 8 p.m. The old-fashioned Dutch dinner consists of one simple course: potatoes, meat and vegetables—known under the acronym "AVG" (aardappelen, vlees, groente). AVG consists traditionally of potatoes with a large portion of vegetables and a small portion of meat with gravy, or a potato and vegetable stew. Vegetable stews served as side dishes are for example rodekool met appeltjes (red cabbage with apples), or rode bieten (beetroot). Regular spices used in stews of this kind may be bay leaves, juniper berries, cloves, and vinegar, although strong spices are generally used sparingly. Stews are often served with pickles, including augurken (gherkins) or cocktail onions (zilveruitjes). Due to the influx of other countries, traditional meals have lost some popularity. Stamppot, mashed potatoes with different options for vegetables, is traditionally eaten in winter. If there is a starter, it is usually soup.

The below-listed meals have historic origins as meals for common laborers. From the 17th to the 19th century workers worked 10 to 16 hours on farms or in factories in unheated rooms, hence these meals are very heavy on calories and fat and were meant to replenish a laborer's energy.

Stamppot, boiled potatoes mashed with vegetables and served with meat and/or gravy, coming in a number of varieties:
 Hutspot, made with potatoes, carrots, and onions served with meats like rookworst (smoked sausage), slow-cooked meat, or bacon. Before potatoes were introduced in Europe hutspot was made from parsnips, carrots, and onions.
 Stamppot andijvie, raw endive mashed with hot potatoes, served with diced fried spek (a kind of bacon).
 Hete bliksem ("hot lightning"), boiled potatoes and green apples, served with stroop (treacle) or tossed with diced speck.
 Stamppot zuurkool, sauerkraut mashed with potatoes. Served with fried bacon or a sausage. Sometimes curry powder, raisins or slices of pineapple or banana are used to give a stamppot an exotic touch.
 Stamppot boerenkool, curly kale mixed with potatoes, served with gravy, mustard, and rookworst sausage. It is one of the oldest and most popular Dutch dishes. Boerenkool was mentioned in cookbooks from the year 1661. Mashed potatoes were not used in this dish at that time, although the sausage was already served with the cabbage in this dish. The dish became popular after a few bad corn seasons, when potatoes became popular as food. Stamppot boerenkool is high in carbohydrates, which makes it a popular meal for cold winter days.
 Snert, also called erwtensoep, is a very thick pea soup that can be served either as a main dish or as an appetizer and is traditionally eaten during the winter. Snert has a very thick consistency and often includes pieces of pork and rookworst and is almost a stew rather than a soup. Due to the thick consistency of Dutch pea soup, it is often said that "...you should be able to stand a spoon upright in a good pea soup". The meat from the soup may also be put on the rye bread and eaten with mustard.

Meat dishes:

 Gehaktballen (meatballs, usually half pork, half beef).
 Slavink, minced meat wrapped in bacon.
 Balkenbrij, a type of liverwurst and meatloaf. The butter-based gravy (boterjus) in which the meat has been fried or cooked is also served. A variant of this, eaten around the IJsselmeer, is butter en eek, where vinegar is added to the gravy.

Flour dishes:

 Pannekoeken (large and thin pancakes) with bacon, apples, cheese, or raisins.
 Poffertjes (miniature pancakes) and spekdik (a Northern variant with bacon).
  (similar to French toast).
 Broeder, a type of boiled pudding usually containing buckwheat, is a traditional dinner mainly in West Friesland.

Seafood:

 (mussels) are quite popular and commonly served with French fries.
Kibbeling, chunks of sea fish that are battered and fried.

Dessert 

The final course is a sweet dessert, traditionally yogurt with some sugar or vla, thin milk pudding (cooked milk with custard). Other desserts include:

Vla (vanilla custard) is often mixed with yogurt (and sometimes yoghurt and syrup, making the Dutch vla-flip).
, a bread porridge made from old bread, milk, butter, and sugar.
, a sweet pudding made of semolina and served with red berry coulis.

 (rice pudding)
Krentjebrij (also called watergruwel)

Special occasions 

The birth of a child is an occasion for serving  beschuit met muisjes (Dutch rusk covered with sugared aniseed).

The Dutch festival of Sinterklaas is held on 5 December. Saint Nicholas leaves gifts in the children's shoes. On this occasion, the Dutch drink hot chocolate milk and eat spice cookies, like speculaas.

Christmas in the Netherlands is a typical family holiday. Traditionally there is family brunch with kerststol (fruited raisin bread; often filled with almond paste). Christmas dinner is also a family occasion where  (a kind of roulade consisting of spiced pork), roast pork, game, or other luxury meat may be served. Another popular Christmas dinner tradition is gourmetten, where people cook their own food on a special gourmetset on the table, although this isn't limited to Christmas.

Also ananasbeignets (pineapple fritter) are considered a treat. Oliebollen are yeast dough balls, either plain or filled with glacé fruits, apple pieces, raisins, and sultanas are served with powdered sugar and are a special treat for New Year's Eve.

In the 17th century, Dutch settlers also took their oliebollen to the American colonies, where they are now known in a slightly different form as doughnuts. In Limburg, nonnevotten are sometimes served during New Year's Eve, although it is mostly eaten during Carnival. Around New Years  are popular, in particular in the northern provinces.

On birthdays all kinds of cakes and cookies are eaten, including appeltaart, bossche bol,  (cookies filled with almond meal), janhagel, peperkoek (gingerbread), spekkoek (originally from Indonesia), tompouce, and stroopwafel.
Poffertjes are tiny puffed pancakes served on special occasions, served warm with melting butter and powdered sugar on top. They are mostly combined with a drink: plain milk, chocolate milk, or a yogurt drink. Cafeterias all around the Netherlands sell poffertjes. Poffertjes can be eaten as a dessert after dinner or as a sweet lunch.

Sweets 

A famous Dutch sweet is zoute drop and other liquorice sweets. These sweets are small, black and look much like gums. Similar to Pontefract cakes found in Yorkshire, England. The four types of drop are soft sweet, soft salt, hard sweet, and hard salty drop. Liquorice can be bought in shops and pharmacies. It also has a medical function as it is supposed to soften the symptoms throat and stomach aches. Dutch drop is sold in a large variety of shapes and forms. When they are flavored with coconut fondant they are called  (lit. "English liquorice"; liquorice allsorts). Other varieties are made with honey, salmiac salt, salmiac salt (salmiakdrop), or bay laurel.

Typical shapes are diamonds, ovals, oblongs, and coins (known as munten in Dutch, leading to the name "muntdrop"). A honeycomb shape for honey  is also popular. Some manufacturers have introduced speciality ranges where the drop is made in thematic shapes, such as cars, farm animals, and farm machinery, and so on.

Another popular Dutch sweet is the stroopwafel ("stroop" meaning syrup). A thin waffle cookie, made typically in a pizelle pan, is sliced horizontally and used for sandwiching a layer of syrup, the stroop. Occasionally, crushed hazelnuts will be mixed with the stroop, and the dough may be spiced with cinnamon.

One of the Dutch confectionery specialties is vlaai. It is a sweet pie made with a yeast dough and filled with fruit (such as apple, apricot, pineapple, plum, or berry filling). Other ingredients may include custard and rhubarb. Rice vlaai, stuffed with a rich rice-and-cream filling, and pudding vlaai sprinkled with crumbs are also popular. They can be additionally grafted with fruits, whipped cream or chocolate.

Banket is a type of pastry or cookie that is traditionally eaten on Saint Nicholas Day (6 December, though the actual celebration is on Saint Nicholas Eve, the 5th) and on Christmas Eve in Holland.

Alcoholic drinks 

Wine plays only a modest role in Dutch cuisine, but there are many brands of beer and strong alcoholic liquor. The most famous Dutch beer producers are Heineken in the west, Grolsch in the east, Alfa and Bavaria in the south. Traditionally, North Brabant and Limburg had a strong beer tradition, brewing many different types of beer (not unlike beer in Belgium). Other traditional Dutch lagers that are commonly found in the country are Gulpener (especially in the northern Netherlands), Hertog Jan, and Budels. Jupiler is also a very common beer in the Netherlands, even though it is produced in Belgium. 

Dutch cities in the west had a long brewing tradition as well, but in the 20th century, big brewers took over many smaller breweries or offered them a license to sell their beer brand, while stopping their own production. 

In the 21st century, many new microbreweries were founded, brewing top fermenting beers in many different styles. In September 2013, there were 184 active breweries in the Netherlands. Popular styles include bock, trappist ale, stout, and wheat beer, though in the 2010s IPA variations became very popular throughout the country, especially in Amsterdam, as the craft brewing industry expanded. Some of the most popular craft breweries in the Netherlands are Brouwerij 't IJ, Jopen, and Two Chefs brewing.  

Of the range of bitters, Beerenburg is the most famous.

Fast food 

The Dutch have their own types of fast food, sold at a snack bar. A Dutch fast food meal often consists of French fries (called patat or friet) with sauce and meat. The most common sauce to accompany French fries is fritessaus (a low-fat mayonnaise substitute), or ketchup (often the currysaus variety), hot peanut sauce, and a pickle relish of chopped vegetables and spices, such as piccalilli or joppiesaus.

Sometimes the fries are served with a combination of sauces, such as speciaal (lit. "war"), which consists of fries covered in hot peanut sauce, mayonnaise, and chopped raw onions.

A recently introduced Dutch-Turkish variety from Rotterdam is the kapsalon (lit. "barbershop"), consisting of fries, topped with either shawarma, kebab, or döner kebab and finished with salad, cheese, and various sauces such as sambal and garlic sauce.

Snacks made with meat are usually deep fried. This includes the frikandel (a skinless minced meat sausage) and the kroket (a meat ragout roll covered in breadcrumbs). They are available in bread rolls, especially Broodje kroket for carry out. A smaller, round version of the croquette is the bitterballen with mustard, often served as a snack in bars but also at official receptions.

Other snacks are the Indonesian-inspired bamischijf (a disk shaped mie goreng patty which is covered with breadcrumbs and deep-fried),  (similar to the bamischijf, a deep-fried nasi goreng filled ball covered in breadcrumbs), and kaassoufflé (lit. "cheese soufflé", a deep fried puff pastry envelope with a small amount of cheese in the center, popular with vegetarians).

Fish is also sold as a fast food at the so-called viskraam, most often street stalls and market stalls that specialize only in prepared fish products. The Netherlands is famous for its raw herring, optionally served together with chopped raw onions and gherkins, which is eaten by lifting the herring high up into the air by its tail and then biting into it upwards (except for Amsterdam, where the herring is cut into pieces and served on paper plates). Raw herring is also commonly sold in a soft white bun.

Other popular fish snacks are kibbeling (deep-fried, nugget-sized chunks of Atlantic cod), lekkerbekje (deep-fried cod, similar to the British fish and chips, but delicately spiced and with a more tempura-like batter), gerookte paling (smoked European eel), and rollmops.

Gallery

See also 

 Wannée Kookboek (1910– )
 Nieuwe Haagse Kookboek (1934– )
 List of Dutch chefs
 Beer in the Netherlands
 Dutch cheese markets
 FEBO – a chain of fast food outlets that uses vending machines to serve krokets, frikandellen, kaassoufflés, and other items
 Pannekoek – a Dutch/Indonesian pancake
 Stroopwafel – a Dutch/Indonesian waffle
 Babi panggang – a Dutch/Indonesian/Chinese fusion dish
 Spekkoek – a Dutch/Indonesian cake
 Coleslaw – from the Dutch words "kool" (cabbage) and "sla" (salad)
 Rijsttafel – Dutch for rice table. Indonesian styled dish. Side dishes served in small portions, accompanied by rice prepared in several different ways
 Hollandse Nieuwe – Fresh (raw) Herring

References

External links 

 Dutch food and eating habits
 Hutspot recipe
 The Dutch Table – an online resource for Dutch recipes
 Food of the Dutch Photo-documentary by photographer Wim Klerkx, 2005–2007

 
Dutch culture